The 2019 Knoxville Challenger was a professional tennis tournament played on indoor hard courts. It was the sixteenth edition of the tournament which was part of the 2019 ATP Challenger Tour. It took place in Knoxville, United States between 4 and 10 November 2019.

Singles main-draw entrants

Seeds

 1 Rankings are as of October 28, 2019.

Other entrants
The following players received wildcards into the singles main draw:
  Scott Jones
  Aleksandar Kovacevic
  Brandon Nakashima
  Nathan Ponwith
  Zachary Svajda

The following players received entry from the qualifying draw:
  Strong Kirchheimer
  Andrea Vavassori

The following player received entry as a lucky loser:
  Lloyd Glasspool

Champions

Singles

 Michael Mmoh def.  Christopher O'Connell 6–4, 6–4.

Doubles

 Hans Hach Verdugo /  Adrián Menéndez Maceiras def.  Bradley Klahn /  Sem Verbeek 7–6(8–6), 4–6, [10–5].

References

2019 ATP Challenger Tour
2019
2019 in American tennis
November 2019 sports events in the United States
2019 in sports in Tennessee